Parapoynx ingridae is a moth in the family Crambidae. It was described by Christian Guillermet in 2004. It is found on Réunion in the Indian Ocean.

References

Acentropinae
Moths described in 2004